Zagoria ( or ) is a former municipality in the Gjirokastër County, southern Albania. During the 2015 local government reform, Zagoria became a subdivision of the municipality Libohovë. The population at the 2011 census was 411. Since 2018, the region is at the centre of the expanded Zagoria Nature Park. Zagoria is also considered to be a distinct "ethnographic region" (Albanian: krahina etnografike), traditionally consisting of 10 settlements: Sheper, Nivan, Ndëran, Topovë, Konckë, Hoshteve, Lliar, Vithuq, Doshnicë and Zhej.

Geography

The region primarily is defined by the Zagoria valley, which is 27 kilometres long, with a watershed of 171 kilometres squared. Its highest point is Mount Arapi at 2156 meters above sea level, while the lowest is at 350 meters. It is valued for its natural scenery and its pastoral traditions, and includes the fields of Çajupi, Çajupi Mountain, and a twenty meter high waterfall called the "oars of Doshnica" (Albanian: Rrema e Doshnicës).

Demographics 

The municipality of Zagori has an Orthodox Albanian majority and an Aromanian minority. The municipality consists of the following villages: Sheper, Nivan, Konckë, Vithuq, Hoshtevë, Doshnicë, Zhej, Lliar, Topovë and Nderan. Konckë is inhabited by an Orthodox Albanian population. Doshnicë and Lliar are wholly populated by Orthodox Christians. The villages of Nderan, Nivan, Sheper, Topovë and Zhej are inhabited by Orthodox Albanians and these villages contain some Aromanian families while in Hoshtevë and Vithuq the Aromanian community is a significant minority population of the villages. Aromanian communities were part of the local population of Zagori in 1880, in particular in the villages of Topovë, Zhej and Lliarë. During the Communist era, a number of Aromanian families settled in some villages of Zagori as part of the resettlement policies of the People's Republic of Albania.

Its people practised endogamy by intermarrying within their group, although occasionally the Greeks of Pogoni would marry a bride from the area and teach her Greek. The population of Zagori have dialectal and cultural characteristics of both the Lab and Tosk Albanian subgroups though also forming a unique unit of their own, which traditionally typically did not marry with people from the neighbouring krahina etnografike of Lunxhëria.

Its population is mostly Albanian speaking, traditionally with an Orthodox Christian majority. It borders the regions of Lunxhëria to the west and Pogoni to the south. Historically, from Ottoman times when it was part of Tepelena kaza until 1920, Zagoria depended on Tepelena, but in 1920 it was instead subordinated to Përmeti, and then from 1924 until modern times, it has been subordinated to Gjirokastra.

History 
In 1319-1414 the region was known as "great Zagori" and was part of the Despotate of Epirus with its capital in Ioannina. In 1399, the Greek speaking population of great Zagori joined the Despot of Epirus, Esau, in his campaign against various Albanian and Aromanian tribesmen.

In 1431-1432, there were 188 families and 1600 inhabitants in total; by 1583, this number had grown to 3300, with Sheperi, the largest village, having 600 houses alone. The population growth in the intermittent period was driven by migrations into Zagoria, coming form Kolonja, Laberia, as well as the region of Suli in Greece, as well as other areas, and the incomers came in order to flee religious persecution as well as persecution by personal enemies or foreign invaders.

During the 17th century Greek elementary schools were opened in villages and monasteries of the region. Local Greek education was sponsored by the Orthodox communities and the guilds of Orthodox craftsmen.

During the era of conversions to Islam in the 18th century, Christian Albanian speaking areas such as the region of Zagori strongly resisted those efforts, in particular the villages of Konckë and Sheper. Christianity was preserved in Zagori due to the contribution of various prominent scholars, such as the Greek Orthodox missionary Sophianos who preached in the villages of the area in the early 18th century.

In the mid 19th century, there were 4300 inhabitants of Zagoria. However, this peak population struggled with the limited space of Zagoria, the relative lack of natural resources, and difficulties such as bread shortages. These factors caused a large wave of emigration out of Zagoria. During the 18th to 20th centuries, 80% of males in Zagoria worked abroad (a custom known in the Albanian South as kurbet). The first major wave of permanent emigration occurred in the early 20th century, with Istanbul, Greece and Egypt being major destinations, while America and Canada soon became more popular as destinations; emigration to other parts of Albania was also extensive.
Worldwide today, there are about 18,000 people paternally descended from traceable ancestors in Zagoria.

In World War II, Zagoria was a base for the Albanian partisans within Gjirokaster County, and two partisan brigades were created locally; major meetings were also held in the area among partisan leaders. The war saw 323 houses in Zagoria destroyed, 220 of which were rebuilt after the victory of the partisans.

In the years following the war, new schools were built in the area, as were irrigation works, a local hospital and maternity centre, and a cultural centre. All villages were connected to the electricity grid by 1969. Today, however, many important services remain lacking in the area.

Notable people

Peco Kagjini, politician, mayor of Tirana
Vito Kapo, politician
Mihal Kasso, politician, representative of the Greek minority
Pirro Kondi, politician, Politburo candidate-member
Kiço Ngjela, Communist Albania politician
Aristidh Ruci, politician
Andon Zako Çajupi, poet, activist of the Albanian National Awakening
John Zenevisi, ruler of Gjirokastra in early 15th century.

See also
Protected areas of Albania

References

Former municipalities in Gjirokastër County
Administrative units of Libohovë
Albanian ethnographic regions
Aromanian settlements in Albania